Windsor Meadows State Park is a public recreation area on the west side of the Connecticut River in the town of Windsor, Connecticut. The state park occupies three largely undeveloped sections measuring 48, 19, and 88 acres (from north to south) located between railroad tracks and the river. Park activities include picnicking, fishing, boating, hiking, and biking.

History 
The park's undeveloped riparian forest and flood plain resemble the landscape seen by Adriaen Block and his crew when they sailed up the river in 1619. The State of Connecticut acquired the land in 1968, then listed it in the 1969 edition of the State Register and Manual as a 128-acre conservation area. Plans to develop a riverwalk-type park were furthered in 2012 with the addition of the one-mile Windsor River Trail.

Activities and amenities
The Windsor River Trail is a 10-foot-wide, handicapped-accessible path with scenic overlooks that parallels the river southward from the Captain John Bissell Memorial Bridge before turning inland, crossing Decker's Brook on an iron bridge, and coming to an end near Meadow Road. The park is also the western terminus of the  Bissell Bridge Walkway Trail, which crosses the river on Bissell Bridge (I-291). Boaters can access the river from a launch ramp located at the bridge's base.

References

External links
Windsor Meadows State Park Connecticut Department of Energy and Environmental Protection
Windsor Meadows State Park Map Connecticut Department of Energy and Environmental Protection

State parks of Connecticut
Windsor, Connecticut
Parks in Hartford County, Connecticut
Protected areas established in 1968
1968 establishments in Connecticut